Amsinckia tessellata is a species of fiddleneck known by the common names bristly fiddleneck, tessellate fiddleneck, checker fiddleneck, and devil's lettuce.

The plant is native to dry regions of western North America, more specifically eastern Washington and Idaho, much of California and the Great Basin, to southwest New Mexico (U.S.) and northwest Sonora and Baja California in Mexico, usually below  elevation.

It is a common plant in many types of habitats, including chaparral, oak woodland, xeric scrub, temperate valleys, disturbed areas, and deserts including the Mojave Desert and Sonoran Desert.


Description
[[File:Amsinckia_tessellata_7740.JPG|thumb|left|The A. tessellata'''s inflorescence bears flowers each with an orangish corolla and calyx with four lobes.]]Amsinckia tessellata'' is an 8–24 inches tall bristly annual herb similar in appearance to other fiddlenecks.

Its coiled inflorescence holds yellow to orange tubular flowers up to a centimeter wide at the corolla, which often has fewer than five lobes. Calyx lobes are not uniform in width and may be fused below the middle. The bloom period is March to June.

References

External links

Amsinckia tessellata - Photo gallery

tessellata
Flora of British Columbia
Flora of the Northwestern United States
Flora of Arizona
Flora of Baja California
Flora of California
Flora of Nevada
Flora of New Mexico
Flora of Sonora
Flora of Utah
Flora of the California desert regions
Flora of the Great Basin
Flora of the Sonoran Deserts
Natural history of the California chaparral and woodlands
Natural history of the California Coast Ranges
Natural history of the Mojave Desert
Natural history of the Transverse Ranges
Plants described in 1874
Flora without expected TNC conservation status